Johannes Hendrik 'Buks' Snyman (born ) is a South African rugby union player for the  in the Currie Cup and the Rugby Challenge. His regular position is hooker or flank.

References

South African rugby union players
Living people
1993 births
Rugby union players from Johannesburg
Rugby union hookers
Free State Cheetahs players
Golden Lions players
Falcons (rugby union) players